Frank Leslie Walton (2 February 1955 - 1 April 2022) was a British philatelist and a former president of the Royal Philatelic Society London. He was formerly editor of The London Philatelist. Walton was a specialist in the philately of Sierra Leone. He is a signatory to the Roll of Distinguished Philatelists.

References 

British philatelists
Presidents of the Royal Philatelic Society London
Signatories to the Roll of Distinguished Philatelists
Philately of Sierra Leone
1955 births

Living people